Beate Walter-Rosenheimer (born 20 November 1964) is a German politician of Alliance 90/The Greens who has been serving as a member of the Bundestag from the state of Bavaria since 2012. Prior to her political career, she worked as a freelance psychologist. In parliament, she has served on various committees and was her parliamentary group's spokesperson for youth policy, education, and training.

Early life and career 
Born in Weißenburg, Bavaria, Walter-Rosenheimer grew up in Ingolstadt and Munich, where she graduated from high school in 1985. She then studied communication sciences, philosophy, history and psychology at the Ludwig Maximilian University of Munich (Diplom-Psychologin).

Walter-Rosenheimer then worked as a freelance psychologist in the fields of industrial psychology, coaching and clinical psychology. From 2009 to 2011, she was a research assistant to Margarete Bause, the parliamentary party leader of the Greens in the State Parliament of Bavaria.

Political career 
On 16 January 2012 Walter-Rosenheimer moved up to the Bundestag. In parliament, she has served on the Committee on Education, Research and Technology Assessment (2013–2021); the Committee on Family, Senior Citizens, Women and Youth (2013–2021); the Committee on Human Rights and Humanitarian Aid (since 2021); and the Committee on Petitions (since 2021). She was also a member of the Enquete Commission on Vocational Training. From 2013 until 2021, she was her parliamentary group’s spokesperson for youth policy, education and training.

Personal life
Walter-Rosenheimer has five children. She lives in Munich.

References

External links 

  
 Bundestag biography 

1964 births
Living people
Members of the Bundestag for Bavaria
Female members of the Bundestag
21st-century German women politicians
Members of the Bundestag 2017–2021
Members of the Bundestag 2013–2017
Members of the Bundestag 2009–2013
Members of the Bundestag for Alliance 90/The Greens
Ludwig Maximilian University of Munich alumni
People from Weißenburg in Bayern